BES-5, also known as Bouk or Buk, was a Soviet thermoelectric generator that was used to power 31 satellites in the US-A (RORSAT) project. The heat source was a uranium 235 fast fission nuclear reactor (FNR).

Background
Spacecraft nuclear reactors are typically fast reactors for the following reasons. First, normal moderator materials (carbon, water) add bulk and mass which is not desirable in a spacecraft. Second, for reasons of nucleonics the fuel must be highly enriched to have a lightweight critical mass (similar to small reactor designs on nuclear submarines). Note that some of the 238U (which is fertile and not fissile) will be converted to 239Pu during operation, and this is taken into consideration during the design and while estimating the power output and design life expectancy.

Reactor design
The design of the BES-5 FNR is such that a sub-critical assembly exists into which a rod of fissile material is inserted.  Feedback and monitoring of the power level will keep the reactor delayed critical and not prompt critical, which can be done by a mechanical control system.

The uranium fuel was more than 90% enriched 235U 

Use in space
The BES-5 reactor was used in more than 31 satellite missions to power the radar units of the US-A surveillance satellites. The reactor was designed to be boosted to a high orbit at the end of its operational life, to prevent the radioactive fuel from re-entering earth's atmosphere.

There were several mishaps related to failures in the ejection system, most notably Kosmos 954, which scattered debris over Canada. Kosmos 1402 also re-entered the atmosphere, but burned up over the Atlantic Ocean, away from populated areas. Kosmos 1900 failed to reach its disposal orbit, and remains in low earth orbit.

See also 
Romashka reactor
SNAP-10A
TOPAZ nuclear reactor
List of nuclear power systems in space

References 

Nuclear power in space
Nuclear technology in the Soviet Union
Satellite nuclear reactors